Zahara were a jazz fusion ensemble who released one album for Antilles Records.

They consisted of several notable members including Reebop Kwaku Baah (percussion), Paul Delph (keyboards), Bryson Graham (drums), Rosko Gee (bass).

References

American jazz ensembles
Jazz fusion ensembles
Antilles Records artists